First Story is an English non-profit organisation that encourages young people to write creatively, outside the curriculum, for self-expression, pleasure and agency. Its stated mission is to empower young people from low-income communities to find and develop their own unique voices and, in doing so, thrive in education and beyond. The charity works in state secondary schools serving low-income communities and its operating regions are Greater London, the East Midlands and the North of England. 

First Story's flagship Young Writers Programme places professional authors into schools, where they work intensively with a consistent cohort of young people, to develop confidence, creativity and writing ability. The programme culminates in the publication of an anthology of students' writing, edited by their Writer-in-Residence. First Story professionally produces over 60 new publications every year and each anthology has a unique cover design and ISBN. In addition to its core programme offer, the charity also runs creative writing competitions and events for programme participants. 

The charity's current Chief Executive is Antonia Byatt, a former head of English PEN and the Cheltenham Literature Festival. Its current Chair of Trustees is Ed Baden-Powell and Patron is Her Royal Highness the Duchess of Cornwall. 

In the 2018–19 academic year, First Story worked in 73 schools across England and 1,565 students (aged 11–16) completed its intensive Writer-in-Residence programme.

History
First Story was founded in London in 2008 by a former Teach First teacher, Katie Waldegrave, and a professional writer, William Fiennes, to provide young people in state education with extra-curricular support to develop their confidence, creativity and writing ability. Fiennes and Waldegrave met in 2007, when she was a history teacher at Cranford Community College in west London, and he was the Writer-in-Residence at the fee-paying American School in London. Together they developed a plan to bring Fiennes' creative writing expertise into Waldegrave's less well-resourced state school. Based on the success of this pilot project, a year later the pair founded First Story. 

The organisation's registered charitable objectives are:

 To advance the education of students in secondary schools in low-income communities by providing facilities for education in creative writing that aren’t required to be provided by the local education authority.
 To help young people advance in life by providing support, opportunities and activities which foster their creativity, literacy and talent, in order to build self-confidence, skills and aspiration so they may grow to full maturity as individuals and members of society.
 To promote the arts and, in particular, literature, poetry and creative writing, by inviting, commissioning and maintaining the services of British writers (whether such services require payment or otherwise), and by encouraging and assisting in the promotion, advancement and publication of the works of British writers.

As First Story's first Executive Director, Katie Waldegrave oversaw the charity's growth from one school in London, to more than 50 participating schools nationally. She stepped-down from day-to-day running of the organisation in 2014. The organisation still adhere's to Fiennes' philosophy and creative writing pedagogy and he remains close to the organisation.

Notable Writers 

Anthony Anaxagorou

Dean Atta

Anthony Cartwright

Bali Rai

Rachel Seiffert

Ross Raisin

Juno Dawson

Notes

External links
 First Story Website
Director William Fiennes, and First Story writers Salena Godden, Kate Clanchy and Jon McGregor talk about First Story in The Independent
Tim Pears writes about his experiences as First Story Writer-in-Residence in The Guardian
Frances Wilson writes about First Story in the Sunday Times
Irena Barker writes about First Story in the TES
John Humphreys hears about First Story on the Today Programme
Alex Clark writes about First Story in the Daily Telegraph
Sean Dodson writes about First Story in The Guardian

Educational charities based in the United Kingdom